Netechma is a genus of moths of the family Tortricidae.

Species
Netechma albitermen Razowski & Wojtusiak, 2008
Netechma altitudinaria Razowski & Wojtusiak, 2008
Netechma altobrasiliana Razowski & Becker, 2001
Netechma anterofascia Razowski & Wojtusiak, 2010
Netechma atemeles (Razowski, 1997)
Netechma bicerithium (Razowski, 1997)
Netechma bifascia Razowski & Wojtusiak, 2008
Netechma brevidagus Razowski & Wojtusiak, 2010
Netechma brunneochra Razowski & Wojtusiak, 2006
Netechma caesiata (Clarke, 1968)
Netechma cajanumae Razowski & Wojtusiak, 2008
Netechma camelana Razowski & Wojtusiak, 2008
Netechma cerusata Razowski, 1999
Netechma chamaecera Razowski & Becker, 2001
Netechma chytrostium Razowski & Wojtusiak, 2006
Netechma consequens Razowski, 1999
Netechma consimilis Razowski & Becker, 2002
Netechma cordillerana Razowski & Wojtusiak, 2011
Netechma crucifera Razowski & Wojtusiak, 2008
Netechma cuneifera Razowski & Becker, 2002
Netechma delicta (Razowski, 1997)
Netechma dentata (Meyrick, 1917)
Netechma distincta Razowski & Becker, 2001
Netechma divisoriae Razowski, 1999
Netechma egens Razowski, 1999
Netechma enucleata Razowski, 1999
Netechma epicremna (Meyrick, 1926)
Netechma eurychlora (Meyrick, 1926)
Netechma fausta Razowski & Becker, 2001
Netechma formosa Razowski & Becker, 2001
Netechma furcularia (Razowski, 1997)
Netechma gibberosa Razowski & Becker, 2002
Netechma gilvoniveana Razowski & Wojtusiak, 2010
Netechma gnathocera Razowski & Wojtusiak, 2006
Netechma graphitaspis Razowski & Becker, 2001
Netechma guamotea Razowski & Wojtusiak, 2009
Netechma illecebrosa Razowski & Becker, 2001
Netechma indanzana Razowski & Becker, 2001
Netechma insignata Razowski & Becker, 2001
Netechma jelskii Razowski & Wojtusiak, 2008
Netechma labyrinthica Razowski & Becker, 2001
Netechma lacera (Razowski, 1997)
Netechma lamanana Razowski & Wojtusiak, 2008
Netechma lojana Razowski & Becker, 2001
Netechma luteopoecila Razowski & Becker, 2001
Netechma magna Razowski & Becker, 2001
Netechma miradora Razowski, 1999
Netechma moderata Razowski & Becker, 2001
Netechma modesta (Razowski, 1997)
Netechma napoana Razowski & Wojtusiak, 2009
Netechma neanica (Razowski & Becker, 1986)
Netechma nigralba Razowski & Becker, 2001
Netechma nigricunea Razowski & Wojtusiak, 2006
Netechma niveonigra Razowski & Becker, 2002
Netechma notabilis Razowski & Becker, 2001
Netechma obunca Razowski & Wojtusiak, 2008
Netechma ochrata Razowski & Becker, 2001
Netechma ochrotona Razowski & Pelz, 2003
Netechma oppressa (Meyrick, 1926)
Netechma otongana Razowski & Wojtusiak, 2008
Netechma paralojana Razowski & Wojtusiak, 2006
Netechma parindanzana Razowski & Wojtusiak, 2010
Netechma pecuniosa Razowski & Wojtusiak, 2010
Netechma phaedroma Razowski & Becker, 2001
Netechma phobetrovalva Razowski & Pelz, 2003
Netechma picta Razowski & Becker, 2001
Netechma polycornuta Razowski & Wojtusiak, 2008
Netechma polyspinea Razowski & Becker, 2001
Netechma praecipua (Meyrick, 1917)
Netechma projuncta Razowski, 1999
Netechma pyrrhocolona (Meyrick, 1926)
Netechma pyrrhodelta (Meyrick, 1931)
Netechma quatropuncta Razowski & Wojtusiak, 2010
Netechma saccata Razowski & Wojtusiak, 2010
Netechma sclerophracta (Meyrick, 1936)
Netechma sectionalis (Meyrick, 1932)
Netechma selecta Razowski & Pelz, 2003
Netechma setosa (Meyrick, 1917)
Netechma similis Brown & Adamski, 2002
Netechma simulans Razowski & Wojtusiak, 2009
Netechma spinea Razowski, 1999
Netechma splendida Razowski & Wojtusiak, 2008
Netechma sulphurica Razowski, 1999
Netechma technema (Walsingham, 1914)
Netechma tenuifascia Razowski & Wojtusiak, 2009
Netechma triangulina Razowski, 1999
Netechma triangulum Razowski & Wojtusiak, 2006
Netechma zemiotes Razowski & Wojtusiak, 2010

See also
List of Tortricidae genera

References

 , 2005, World Catalogue of Insects 5
 , 1992, Misc. Zool. 14 (1990): 108.
 , 2002: Black and white forewing pattern in Tortricidae (Lepidoptera), with descriptions of new taxa of Neotropical Euliini. Acta zoologica cracoviensia 45 (3): 245–257. Full article: 
 , 2006: Tortricidae from Venezuela (Lepidoptera: Tortricidae). Shilap Revista de Lepidopterologia 34 (133): 35–79.
 , 2006: Tortricidae (Lepidoptera) from the Valley of Río Gualaceo, East Cordillera in Ecuador, with descriptions of new taxa. Acta Zoologica Cracoviensia 49B (1-2): 17–53. Full article: 
 , 2008: Tortricidae from the Mountains of Ecuador. Part III: Western Cordillera (Insecta: Lepidoptera). Genus 19 (3): 497–575. Full article: 
 , 2008: Tortricidae (Lepidoptera) from the mountains of Ecuador. Part 1: Southern Highlands. Acta Zoologica Cracoviensia 51B (1-2): 7-41. Full article: 
 , 2009: Tortricidae (Lepidoptera) from the mountains of Ecuador and remarks on their geographical distribution. Part IV. Eastern Cordillera. Acta Zoologica Cracoviensia 51B (1-2): 119–187. doi:10.3409/azc.52b_1-2.119-187. Full article: .
 , 2010: Tortricidae (Lepidoptera) from Peru. Acta Zoologica Cracoviensia 53B (1-2): 73-159. . Full article: .
 , 2011: Tortricidae (Lepidoptera) from Colombia). Acta Zoologica Cracoviensia 54B (1-2): 103–128. Full article: .

External links
tortricidae.com

 
Euliini
Tortricidae of South America
Tortricidae genera